Robert Emmett Brady (17 May 1901 – 3 July 1976) was an Australian rules footballer who played with Richmond and Hawthorn in the Victorian Football League (VFL).

Notes

External links 

1901 births
1976 deaths
Australian rules footballers from Victoria (Australia)
Richmond Football Club players
Hawthorn Football Club players